() is a Dolomite plateau and the largest high-altitude Alpine meadow in Europe. Located in Italy's South Tyrol province in the Dolomites mountain range, it is a major tourist attraction, notably for skiing and hiking.

Geography 
It is located in the western part of the Dolomites and has an altitude between 1,680 m a.s.l. and 2,350 m a.s.l.; it extends for 52 km² between Val Gardena to the north, the Sassolungo Group to the north-east and the Sciliar massif to the south-east, which with its unmistakable profile is one of the most famous symbols of all the Dolomites. 
Given the vastness of the area, from here it is possible to admire a large number of mountain groups: among others, the Sella Group, the Rosengarten group and the Marmolada.

It is the largest alp (area where pasture is practiced) in Europe. It is divided into numerous plots reserved to grazing or from which the farmers get hay for their farms located downstream.

The eastern part has been included since 1975 in the Sciliar natural park.

Surrounding peaks 
The alp offers a panoramic view which includes (from north, in a clockwise direction): Peitlerkofel (Sass de Putia, 2,873 m), the Odle and the Puez groups (3,025 m), the Gran Cir, the Sella group (3,152 m), Langkofel (Sassolungo, 3,181 m) and Plattkofel (Sassopiatto, 2,995 m), the Marmolada (3.343 m), the Pala group (Pale di San Martino, 3,192 m), the Vajolet Towers (2,821 m) the Rosengarten group (Catinaccio, 2,981 m) with the peak of the Kesselkogel (Catinaccio d'Antermoia, 3,002 m) and the Schlern (Sciliar, 2,450 m).

Classification 
The SOIUSA system considers the plateau as an alpine group with the following classification:
 Main part: Eastern Alps
 Major sector: South-Eastern Alps
 Section: Dolomites
 Subsection: North-Western Dolomites 
 Supergroup: Gardena's Dolomites
 Group: Seiser Alp Group
 Code: II/C-31. III-A.3

It also attributes to the plateau the three following subgroups:

 Subgroup A: Palancia-Cresta di Siusi ridge
 Subgroup B: Dorsal Denti di Terra Rossa-Punta d'Oro-Piz ridge
 Subgroup C: Dorsal Bulacia-Salames-Col di Rende ridge

Further reading

External links

Tourist attractions in Italy